Texas are a Scottish rock band from Glasgow. They were founded in 1986 by Johnny McElhone (formerly of the bands Altered Images and Hipsway) and Sharleen Spiteri on lead vocals. Texas made their performing debut in March 1988 at the University of Dundee. They took their name from the 1984 Wim Wenders movie Paris, Texas.

The band released their debut album Southside in 1989, along with the debut single "I Don't Want a Lover", which was a top-ten hit on the UK Singles Chart and peaked within the top ten of the charts in many other European countries. Southside entered at number three on the UK Albums Chart and number 88 on the Billboard 200 album chart in the United States, and sold over two million copies worldwide. Despite the success of Southside, the follow-up albums Mothers Heaven (1991) and Ricks Road (1993) were less successful, peaking at number 32 and number 18 on the UK Albums Chart respectively, but achieved moderate success on various European markets.

The band's fortunes changed in 1997 with the release of their White on Blonde album, which entered at the top of the UK albums chart and became their biggest seller. To date it has been certified six times platinum in the United Kingdom. Follow up album The Hush (1999) was also successful, entering at the top of the UK albums chart and certified triple platinum. The band's Greatest Hits album, released in 2000, was another big-seller, again entering at the top of the UK albums chart, and certified six times platinum. Texas would go on to release a further two studio albums, Careful What You Wish For in 2003, and Red Book in 2005, both of which were certified gold in the United Kingdom. After the release of Red Book and a tour to support the album's release, Texas went on hiatus. Lead singer Sharleen Spiteri launched a solo career, releasing her debut solo album, Melody, in 2008.

As of 2017, Texas's worldwide sales were 40 million records and they have had thirteen top-ten singles on the UK singles chart and three number-one albums and eight UK top-ten albums on the UK albums chart. Their ninth studio album, Jump on Board, released in May 2017, peaked within the top ten of the album charts in Belgium and France, whilst their tenth studio album, Hi, released in May 2021, became their highest-charting album in the UK since 1999's The Hush, debuting at number three on the official UK albums chart and number one on the UK independent albums chart, and entering at number one in their native Scotland.

History

1989: Southside

The band's debut single, "I Don't Want a Lover", was released in January 1989. It peaked at number eight on the UK Singles Chart and No. 77 on the US Billboard Hot 100 chart, as well as top-40 positions in various countries worldwide. The band released their debut album, Southside, in March 1989, which peaked at number three on the UK Albums Chart and was certified Gold by the BPI. However, three further singles from the album all failed to make the UK top 40, with "Thrill Has Gone" reaching No. 60, "Everyday Now" faring little better at No. 44 (though reaching the Top 30 in France), and "Prayer for You" stalling at No. 73.

1991–1992: Mothers Heaven

The band's second album, Mothers Heaven, was released in September 1991. It was preceded by the single "Why Believe in You", but this failed to reach the UK top 40 stalling at No. 66 on the UK Singles Chart. This did not bode well for the album, which itself peaked at No. 32 in the UK. A second single, "In My Heart", fared worse and became Texas's lowest-charting single in the UK, reaching No. 74, making it their fifth single in a row to failed to break the top 40. A third single from the album, "Alone with You", was released in January 1992 and reached No. 32, giving them their second top-40 entry.

Ironically, immediately following the disappointing performance of the album and its singles, Texas released a new cover version of the Al Green classic "Tired of Being Alone" in April 1992. The single, which was not included on the album, was more successful and returned the band to the UK top 20, peaking at No. 19.

1993–1994: Ricks Road

Texas released their third album, Ricks Road in November 1993. It was preceded by two more top-40 singles, "So Called Friend" (UK No. 30) and "You Owe It All to Me" (UK No. 39). The album peaked at No. 18 on the UK Albums Chart. The music video for "You Owe It All to Me" was directed by Dani Jacobs, and was filmed in Arizona and features Spiteri and McErlaine filmed in the style of a road movie with the pair encountering another version of themselves along the way. A third single from the album, "So In Love With You", reached No. 28 in the UK in February 1994.

1997–1998: White on Blonde

Following an endorsement by then Radio 1 presenter Chris Evans on his Channel 4 show TFI Friday in 1997, Texas came back to the music scene with the international hit "Say What You Want". The song was released internationally on 6 January 1997 and became the band's highest-peaking single to date on the UK Singles Chart, reaching No. 3 in its second week of release. In February, Texas released their fourth album, White on Blonde, which went on to become the band's most successful album to date. The album debuted at No. 1 on the UK Albums Chart and returned to the top spot again six months later. It remained in the UK top 75 for 91 weeks. A total of five singles were taken from the album, all of which were top-ten hits in the UK. "Halo", released in April 1997, peaked at No. 10, "Black Eyed Boy", released in July 1997, peaked at No. 5, and "Put Your Arms Around Me", released in November 1997, also peaked at No. 10. In 1998, the song was featured in the film Ever After: A Cinderella Story, starring Drew Barrymore. The band then released a double A-sided single of "Insane" along with "Say What You Want (All Day, Every Day)"—a new version of the first hit from the album but now with additional rap vocals from the Wu-Tang Clan. The single peaked at No. 4 in the UK.

White on Blonde became the pinnacle of the band's success, and was certified 6 × Platinum by the BPI for UK sales in excess of 1.8 million copies. It was included in Q magazine's "50 Best Albums of 1997", and voted the 86th-best album of all time by Q readers in 1998. It also ranked No. 34 in Q "Best 50 Albums of Q's Lifetime", as well being included in Q "90 Best Albums of the 1990s". In 2010, it was nominated for the BRIT Awards "Best Album in the Past 25 Years".

1999–2001: The Hush and The Greatest Hits

In April 1999, Texas released the first single from their forthcoming fifth studio album. "In Our Lifetime" peaked at No. 4 on the UK Singles Chart and was also included on the Notting Hill film soundtrack that year. The band's fifth album, The Hush, was released in May 1999 and charted at No. 1 on the UK Albums Chart in its first week of release. A second single, "Summer Son", was released in August 1999, reaching No. 5, the band's seventh UK top-ten single at that point. A third and final single, "When We Are Together", was released in November 1999 and narrowly missed the UK top ten (peaking at 12). The album was certified 3 x Platinum by the BPI for UK sales in excess of 900,000 copies.

In October 2000, Texas released their first compilation album, The Greatest Hits. The album featured tracks spanning their career, from their 1989 debut to the current day and included three new songs. A new single, "In Demand" was released on 2 October 2000 and reached No. 6 in the UK, with a video that featured the actor Alan Rickman. When The Greatest Hits was released, it became the band's third consecutive album to debut at No. 1 in the UK. A second new single from the collection, "Inner Smile", was released at the end of 2000, also reaching No. 6 on the UK Singles Chart. The video for "Inner Smile" featured a homage to Elvis Presley (and specifically his '68 Comeback Special shows) with lead singer Spiteri dressed and made up to look like Elvis in his famous black leather suit. In July 2001, a remix of "I Don't Want A Lover" was released which made the UK top 20. By this time, The Greatest Hits album had become a huge success and was eventually certified 6 × Platinum by the BPI for UK sales in excess of 1.8 million copies.

The single "Like Lovers (Holding On)" was featured during the closing credits of the 2000 animated feature film Titan A.E. and also appears briefly in one scene as background music. The song was included on the Titan A.E. soundtrack as well.

2003: Careful What You Wish For 

In September 2002, Spiteri gave birth to her daughter, Misty Kyd, although motherhood did not prevent her from working on another album. In October 2003, Texas released the first single from their upcoming sixth album titled "Carnival Girl" which featured rapping vocals by Canadian artist Kardinal Offishall. The song reached No. 9 on the UK Singles Chart. Later that month, the album Careful What You Wish For was released. The album peaked at No. 5 on the UK Albums Chart and was certified Gold by the BPI for sales of over 100,000 copies in the United Kingdom. In December 2003, a second and final single was released from the album entitled "I'll See It Through", though this peaked at a lowly No. 40 on the UK Singles Chart.

2005–2006: Red Book

The band returned in August 2005 with a new single "Getaway", which peaked at No. 6, becoming the band's tenth UK top-ten single. It was followed by another new single, "Can't Resist", released in October 2005. The song reached No. 13 in the UK, and was followed by the band's seventh studio album, Red Book, released in November 2005. The album reached No. 16 in the UK Albums Chart, ending their run of top-10 albums though was certified Gold by the BPI for sales of over 100,000 copies in the United Kingdom. A third and final single from the album, "Sleep", was released in January 2006 and peaked at No. 6 on the UK Singles Chart. The song featured vocals from Paul Buchannan from the Scottish band the Blue Nile and the video featured comedian Peter Kay. On 21 February 2006, a promo-only single, "What About Us", was released.

2007–2008: The BBC Sessions and hiatus

On 24 September 2007, the band released The BBC Sessions, which included radio sessions spanning from 1989 to 2005, with extensive liner notes and interviews with Spiteri. Cover songs include Elmore James's "It Hurts Me Too", the Beatles' "I've Got a Feeling", and Ashford & Simpson's "You're All I Need to Get By."

In 2008, Spiteri embarked on a solo career. Her debut album Melody was released in July 2008 and debuted at No. 3 in the UK. Spiteri's second solo studio album The Movie Songbook was released on 1 March 2010, and peaked at No. 13 in the UK.

2009–2011: McErlaine's collapse and reunion

On 8 September 2009, bandmember Ally McErlaine was hospitalised after he collapsed with a massive brain aneurysm at the age of 40. By February 2010, he was recovering well as reported by bandmate Spiteri in The Sunday Mail: "Ally is the most stubborn person I have ever come across, and I think his sheer pigheadedness is the reason he's still here! When he asked what was happening with Texas, I said it was up to him. He told me he wanted to get back into the studio."

After McErlaine survived his collapse—which kills in 80% of cases—Texas reunited for the first time since 2005. The band embarked on a tour in 2011 and lead singer Spiteri appeared on Popstar to Operastar on 12 June 2011 singing a version of the band's hit "Say What You Want". Prior to this, Texas had played at the Den Fynske Landsby Festival in Denmark. At the festival, they debuted a new track "The Conversation" which marked the first time the track has been played outside their native Glasgow.

Spiteri was also invited to make a series of cameo appearances at different events, all of which involved film scores. She sang Yvonne Elliman's "If I Can't Have You" for a Saturday Night Fever tribute concert and duetted with Italian singer Mauro Gioia on the "Love Theme from The Godfather".

2013–2017: The Conversation and Texas 25

In February 2013, Music Week announced the band had signed a new record deal with PIAS Recordings and were to release their first new album since reuniting. The Conversation was released on 20 May 2013. Physical formats included a single disc and double-disc deluxe edition. The latter featured a bonus disc entitled Live in Scotland. Also in 2013, a UK tour was announced and the album launched at two gigs, one at King Tut's Wah Wah Hut in Glasgow and the other at the 100 Club in London. Spiteri performed a cover of "River Deep – Mountain High" at these gigs as well as a selection of new tracks from The Conversation. Tracks are written mainly by Spiteri and McElhone, with Richard Hawley and Bernard Butler as collaborators. The album's lead single of the same name joined BBC Radio 2's playlist in April 2013 with two more singles, "Detroit City" and "Dry Your Eyes", following later that year. The album is certified Platinum in France and peaked at No. 4 on the UK Albums Chart.

In November 2014, Texas contributed to BBC Radio 2's Sounds of the 80s album with a cover of "Don't Talk to Me About Love" by Altered Images, a band which also included current Texas member Johnny McElhone in its lineup.

To celebrate the band's 25th anniversary, it was announced that some of their biggest hits would be re-recorded for a new album entitled Texas 25. The collection features eight songs from the band's back catalogue completely reworked with the help of New York production team Truth & Soul, as well as four brand new songs, and was released on 16 February 2015. Deluxe packages include a second disc of the hits in their original form. The lead single, "Start a Family", premiered online on 6 January 2015. A music video followed, once again starring Alan Rickman who was previously featured in the video for "In Demand".

The band also embarked on a new UK tour throughout April and May 2015. An Evening with Texas was a more intimate arrangement than previous shows and featured stories told by Spiteri from the band's 25 years together.

2017–2019: Jump on Board

The band released their ninth studio album, Jump on Board in May 2017 to critical acclaim, with "Let's Work it Out" serving as the lead single from the new album. Jump on Board performed well commercially in the band's native Scotland, debuting at number one on the Scottish Albums Chart. The album reached number one in France and performed well in the UK chart.

In support of the album, the band embarked on the Jump on Board Live Tour world tour.

2020–present: BMG Records and Hi
On 28 February 2020, the band announced on Twitter that its next album was called Hi, which was released on BMG on 28 May 2021. A single, also called "Hi", was released in December 2020 and reunited the band with the Wu-Tang Clan after 22 years. A video was released for the song with Small Axe actor Kadeem Ramsay, a promo video that also includes footage of Texas, RZA and Method Man performing "Say What You Want" at the BRIT Awards in 1998.

In April 2021, the second single from Hi was released. Called "Mr Haze", the track sampled the melody from "Love's Unkind" (a Giorgio Moroder production which was a top-10 hit for Donna Summer in the late 1970s) and was performed on The One Show on BBC One. Hi is the tenth album released by Texas and includes collaborations with Richard Hawley and Altered Images' Clare Grogan, the latter duetting with Spiteri on the song "Look What You’ve Done".

Hiatus projects

After the release of Texas's 2005 album Red Book the band members confirmed that they would enter a hiatus. Spiteri performed as guest vocalist on Rammstein's "Rosenrot" album. She began work on her debut solo album, working with some of her former bandmates. She wrote the vast majority of the tracks on the album. She released her debut solo album Melody on 14 July 2008 with "All the Times I Cried" serving as the album's lead single. The song charted at No. 26 on the UK Singles Chart. Melody was proven popular in the United Kingdom, debuting at a high No. 3 on the UK Albums Chart. In other European countries where Texas were popular like in Belgium, the album charted at No. 15 on the Belgium Flanders Chart and No. 13 on the Belgium Wallonia Chart. The song "Don't Keep Me Waiting" was released as a single in Switzerland only, in which it charted at No. 78 on the singles chart there. A further two singles were released worldwide, "Stop, I Don't Love You Anymore" and "It Was You" which were both unpopular in the United Kingdom, missing the UK Top 100, with "Stop, I Don't Love You Anymore" charting at No. 107 and "It Was You" at No. 178. By 2009, Melody has been certified Gold by the BPI (United Kingdom) with sales of over 100,000.

Spiteri released her second solo studio album The Movie Songbook which consists of movie covers chosen by Spiteri herself was released on 1 March 2010. The album's lead single "Xanadu" was released in February 2010, and charted at No. 71 on the UK Singles Chart in March 2010. As for the album, it charted at No. 13 on the UK Albums Chart on 7 March 2010, thus becoming Spiteri's second UK top-40 album as a soloist, and her seventh UK top-40 album both as a soloist and a member of Texas. To promote the album, she performed in front of 55,000 fans supporting Paul McCartney on his Up and Coming Tour at Glasgow's Hampden Park.

In 2010, Spiteri was a judge on the Sky 1 reality show Must Be the Music.

Membership
Current members
 Sharleen Spiteri – lead vocals, guitar, keyboards (1988–present)
 Johnny McElhone – bass, guitar, keyboards (1988–present)
 Eddie Campbell – keyboards (1991–present)
 Tony McGovern – guitar, backing vocals (1999–present)
 Cat Myers – drums (2021–present)

Former members
 Stuart Kerr – drums, backing vocals (1989–1991)
 Richard Hynd – drums (1991–1999)
 Mike Wilson – drums (1999–2001)
 Steve Washington – drums (2001–2003)
 Neil Payne – drums (2003–2006)
 Michael Bannister – keyboards (2005–2019)
 Ross McFarlane – drums (2011–2019)
 Ally McErlaine - guitar (1988-2022)

Timeline

Discography

 Southside (1989)
 Mothers Heaven (1991)
 Ricks Road (1993)
 White on Blonde (1997)
 The Hush (1999)
 Careful What You Wish For (2003)
 Red Book (2005)
 The Conversation (2013)
 Jump on Board (2017)
 Hi (2021)

Awards and nominations

Brit Awards

|-
| rowspan="3"| 1998
| White on Blonde 
| MasterCard British Album
| 
|-
| Say What You Want
| Best British Single
| 
|-
| rowspan="2"| Themselves
| rowspan="2"| Best British Group
| 
|-
| 2000
| 
|-
| 2001
| In Demand
| Best British Video
| 

Ivor Novello Awards

|-
| rowspan=3|1998
| "Say What You Want"
| rowspan=2|Most Performed Work
| 
|-
| "Black Eyed Boy"
| 
|-
| Themselves
| Outstanding Song Collection
| 

MTV Europe Music Awards

|-
| 1999
| Themselves
| Best UK & Ireland Act
| 

Music & Media Year-End Awards

!Ref.
|-
| 1989
| Southside
| Debut Album of the Year
| 
| 

Music Week Women in Music Awards

|-
| 2017
| Sharleen Spiteri
| Inspirational Artist
| 

NME Awards

|-
| 2003
| rowspan=2|Sharleen Spiteri
| rowspan=2|Sexiest Woman
| 
|-
| 2005
| 

NRJ Music Awards

|-
| 1999
| Themselves
| International Duo/Group of the Year
| 

Q Awards

|-
| 1999
| The Hush 
| Best Album
| 

Smash Hits Poll Winners Party

|-
| 1989
| rowspan=2|Themselves
| Most Promising New Group
| 
|-
| 2000
| Best British Band
|

References

External links

 
 
 Red Sky July Ally McErlaine's other group

Musical groups from Glasgow
Musical groups established in 1986
Brit Award winners
Scottish alternative rock groups
Scottish pop rock music groups
Culture in East Dunbartonshire
1986 establishments in Scotland
1986 establishments in the United Kingdom
Mercury Records artists
Vertigo Records artists
PIAS Recordings artists
Female-fronted musical groups